Bench Warmer International is a company that produces trading cards featuring female models. Bench Warmer International is a manufacturer and distributor of collectible trading cards in the U.S. 
 
In 1989 Connie Woods became the first woman to have her own trading card set when she conceptualized, created and founded Bench Warmer Trading Cards. This six card set, produced solely by Miss Woods, was limited to a run of 10,000 sets.  

She holds the distinct honor of being "The Original Bench Warmer" and her silhouette in a softball uniform on a bench is the logo for Bench Warmer Trading Cards. 

Founded in 1992, Bench Warmer International, Inc. released a second set of Bench Warmer trading cards using its motto "Trading Cards Never Looked So Good". The premier edition featured nearly 100 different up-and-coming models, actresses and starlets including Baywatch actresses Cory Givens and Traci Bingham. Models are featured in swimsuits, lingerie or wearing various sports gear and attire. This time 20,000,000 cards were printed and distributed.

After a disagreement it was discovered that her partner Brian Wallos had secretly packaged product, was selling it through his other corporation and then lending the money back to Bench Warmer, Inc. and after a legal battle, the Bench Warmer brand was owned by Brian Wallos. .

References

External links
 

Manufacturing companies based in California
Trading card companies